The nine arrondissements of Lyon are the administrative divisions of the City of Lyon. Unlike the spiral pattern of the arrondissements of Paris, or the meandering pattern of those in Marseille, the layout in Lyon is more idiosyncratic.

History

Arrondissements of Lyon in 1852
1st arrondissement: as today (Terreaux, Martinière/St-Vincent, Pentes de la Croix-Rousse)
2nd arrondissement: as today (Cordeliers, Bellecour, Ainay, Perrache, Confluent)
3rd arrondissement: former commune of La Guillotière (all of the Left Bank of the Rhône)
4th arrondissement: as today (former commune of La Croix-Rousse)
5th arrondissement: all of the Right Bank of the Saône (including Fourvière and the former commune of Vaise)

As the 19th century progressed, the area known then as Les Broteaux (sic) started to be developed by Morand and consequently the population of this part of the 3rd arrondissement began to increase rapidly. In 1867, the decision was taken to split the 3rd arrondissement in two, and a 6th arrondissement was created north of Cours Lafayette.

In 1894, the 6th arrondissement was expanded to include all of the Parc de la Tête d'Or, which until then had been split between Lyon and Villeurbanne.

As the turn of the century approached, the southern parts of the 3rd arrondissement also began to experience considerable development. By 1912, the population had increased so much that a decision was once again taken to split the 3rd arrondissement; a 7th arrondissement was created south of Cours des Brosses (today Cours Gambetta/Cours Albert Thomas/Avenue Rockefeller).

The development of Monplaisir and the surrounding area throughout the 20th century led to a further split, in 1959, when an 8th arrondissement was created to the east of the Lyon–Marseille railway line.

Four years later, Lyon's last annexation took place: in 1963, the commune of St-Rambert-l'Île-Barbe was incorporated into the 5th arrondissement. However, one year later, the decision was taken to split what had become a sprawling and populous arrondissement into two: in 1964, the 9th arrondissement came into being. The seemingly arbitrary boundary (along Avenue Barthélemy Buyer and across Fourvière to join the banks of the Saône north of St-Paul), which does not follow the historical limit between Lyon and Vaise (which lay further north), was probably drawn for convenience's sake prior to the completion of the Champvert neighbourhood, which is now split between the 5th and the 9th arrondissements.

Arrondissements of Lyon since 1964
1st arrondissement: Presqu'île north (Terreaux, Martinière/St-Vincent), Pentes de la Croix-Rousse – served by metro lines A, C and D
2nd arrondissement : Presqu'île south (Cordeliers, Bellecour, Ainay, Perrache, Confluence) – served by metro lines A and D and tram lines T1 and T2
3rd arrondissement: Préfecture, Guillotière north, Part-Dieu, Villette, Sans Souci/Dauphiné, Montchat, Grange Blanche north – served by metro lines B and D and tram lines T1 and T3
4th arrondissement: Plateau de la Croix-Rousse, Serin – served by metro line C
5th arrondissement: Vieux Lyon (St-Paul, St-Jean, St-Georges), Fourvière, St-Just, St-Irénée, Point du Jour, Ménival, Battières, Champvert south – served by metro line D and funicular lines F1 and F2
6th arrondissement: Brotteaux, Bellecombe, Parc de la Tête d'Or, Cité Internationale – served by metro lines A and B and tram line T1
7th arrondissement: Guillotière south, Jean Macé, Gerland – served by metro lines B and D and tram lines T1 and T2
8th arrondissement: Monplaisir, Monplaisir-la-Plaine, États-Unis, Bachut, Grand Trou/Moulin à Vent, Mermoz, Laënnec/Transvaal, Grange Blanche south – served by metro line D and tram lines T2 and T4
9th arrondissement: Vaise, Gorge de Loup, Observance, Duchère (Balmont, Château, Plateau, Sauvegarde), Rochecardon, St-Rambert-l'Île-Barbe, Champvert north – served by metro line D

Geographically, Lyon's two main rivers, the Saône and the Rhône, divide the arrondissements into three groups:
To the west of the Saône, the 5th arrondissement covers the old city (Vieux Lyon), Fourvière hill and the plateau beyond. The 9th is immediately to the north, and stretches from Gorge de Loup, through Vaise to the neighbouring suburbs of Écully, Champagne-au-Mont-d'Or, Saint-Didier-au-Mont-d'Or, Saint-Cyr-au-Mont-d'Or and Collonges-au-Mont-d'Or.
Between the two rivers, on the Presqu'île (Peninsula) are the 2nd, 1st and 4th arrondissements. The 2nd includes most of the city centre, including Place Bellecour and Perrache railway station, and reaches as far as the confluence of the two rivers. The 1st is directly to the north of the 2nd and covers part of the city centre (including the Hôtel de Ville) and the slopes (pentes) of the Croix-Rousse, up to Boulevard de la Croix-Rousse. To the north of the Boulevard is the 4th arrondissement, which covers the Plateau of the Croix-Rousse, up to its boundary with Cuire in the commune of Caluire-et-Cuire.
To the east of the Rhône, are the 3rd, 6th, 7th and 8th arrondissements.

The future – further arrondissements for Lyon?
Although the neighbouring town of Villeurbanne is sometimes referred to as Lyon's "10th arrondissement", the likelihood of it ever being incorporated into the city is remote. Villeurbanne resisted annexation in 1852 (only ceding its section of the Parc de la Tête d'Or in 1894 in exchange for a considerable payment from its larger neighbour), and now has a sufficiently strong identity and sufficiently high population – 134,000 (2005 estimate), making it France's most populous suburban commune – for the prospect of annexation to be all but dead. Indeed, most of the benefits that being part of Lyon might bring for Villeurbanne are already provided by the Grand Lyon urban community (intercommunality structure).

List of arrondissements

See also 
 List of streets and squares in Lyon

References